The 1997 Dallas Burn season was the second season of the Major League Soccer team. The team made the playoffs for the second consecutive year. The team also won the U.S. Open Cup during the season.

Final standings

Regular season

Playoffs

Western Conference semifinals

Western Conference finals

U.S. Open Cup

References

External links
Season statistics

1997
Dallas Burn
Dallas Burn
Dallas Burn
1997